Dyadobacter beijingensis  is a bacterium from the genus of Dyadobacter which has been isolated from the rhizosphere from turf grasses from the Taoranting Park in Beijing in China.

References

External links
Type strain of Dyadobacter beijingensis at BacDive -  the Bacterial Diversity Metadatabase	

Cytophagia
Bacteria described in 2007